Timonium may refer to:

Places
 Timonium (Paphlagonia), an ancient fort
 Timonium, Maryland
 Timonium Road, exit 16 off Interstate 83 in Maryland
 Timonium (Baltimore Light Rail station)
 Timonium Business Park (Baltimore Light Rail station)
 Timonium Fairgrounds and Timonium Racetrack, location of the Maryland State Fair

Others
 A fictional ore (see List of fictional elements, materials, isotopes and atomic particles)
 The uncompleted palace of Mark Antony in Alexandria